A hag is a wizened old woman, or a fairy with the appearance of an old woman.

Hag  may also refer to:
HAG, a Swiss model train company
Håg, in Scandinavian mythology
Hag (album), a 1971 album by Merle Haggard
Hag (Dungeons & Dragons), a class of fictional role playing monster
Hag and Mag, a pair of demons in Mandaeism
Hag and Troll, demonic super villains in the Marvel Comics Universe
Book of Haggai, a book of the Hebrew Bible
Café HAG, a brand of decaffeinated coffee
Hagley railway station, in England
Hag moth (Phobetron pithecium), a moth of the family 
Hanga language, spoken in Ghana
High Assurance Guard, computer security device
Hoang Anh Gia Lai Group, a Vietnamese company
Jewish holidays (Hebrew:)
Kari Hag (born 1941), Norwegian mathematician
Peat hag, erosion

See also
Hagg (disambiguation)
Haga (disambiguation)
Haig (disambiguation)
Chag (disambiguation)
Night hag (disambiguation)